Christopher Perkins (born February 29, 1968) is a Canadian American game designer and editor who is known for his work on Wizards of the Coast's Dungeons & Dragons role-playing game, currently as the senior story designer.

Career
Under the pen name "Christopher Zarathustra", Perkins got his career start in 1988 writing the adventure "Wards of Witching Ways" for Dungeon magazine #11. He later officially started working for Wizards of the Coast in 1997, beginning as the editor for Dungeon. A few years later, he was promoted to editor-in-chief of Wizards periodicals.

Perkins later became the senior producer for Dungeons & Dragons, leading the team of designers, developers, and editors who make products for the Dungeons & Dragons role-playing game. Perkins was the story manager for Dungeons & Dragons in 2007 before the release of the game's fourth edition. Perkins was working on the Star Wars Saga Edition while Dungeons & Dragons fourth edition was being developed, and ideas were exchanged freely between Perkins and the fourth edition team. He was also on the SCRAMJET team, led by Richard Baker, and including James Wyatt, Matthew Sernett, Ed Stark, Michele Carter, and Stacy Longstreet; this team updated the setting and cosmology of Dungeons & Dragons as the fourth edition was being developed. Perkins was the Lead Story Designer of the Ravenloft fifth edition reboot Curse of Strahd, released in 2016.

Perkins wrote a blog, "The Dungeon Master Experience", on the Wizards of the Coast website for over two years, where he shared tricks and advice about the challenge of "dungeon mastering" a campaign through the lens of his homebrew world, Iomandra. However, in the penultimate posting of March 2013, he announced the following posting would be the last "at least for a while", whereupon the blog became inactive.

He was also the longtime Dungeon Master for the Acquisitions Incorporated Dungeons & Dragons games at the Penny Arcade Expo (PAX), until PAX Unplugged 2018.

Livestreams 
From 2016 to 2019, Perkins was the Dungeon Master in the Twitch livestream Dice, Camera, Action, which was a live play-through of Dungeons & Dragons' latest story lines. He has also guest starred twice on the Dungeons & Dragons-based show, Critical Role.

Personal life 
In his free time, Perkins runs a Dungeons & Dragons campaign set in his homebrew world of Iomandra.

References

1968 births
Canadian American
Canadian emigrants to the United States
Dungeons & Dragons game designers
Living people
People from Seattle
Place of birth missing (living people)